The Frankfort School at 400 Locust St. in Frankfort, Kansas was built during 1902–03.  It was listed on the National Register of Historic Places in 1972.

It was deemed to be "an excellent example of Renaissance-influenced turn-of-the-century school architecture in Kansas."

The school was designed by local architect A.W. Snodgrass after the previous, 1880-built school was destroyed by a fire caused by a lightning strike on August 20, 1902.

References

School buildings on the National Register of Historic Places in Kansas
Renaissance Revival architecture in Kansas
School buildings completed in 1903
Marshall County, Kansas
1903 establishments in Kansas